The Adams Prize is one of the most prestigious prizes awarded by the University of Cambridge. It is awarded each year by the Faculty of Mathematics at the University of Cambridge and St John's College to a UK-based mathematician for distinguished research in the Mathematical Sciences.

The prize is named after the mathematician John Couch Adams. It was endowed by members of St John's College and was approved by the senate of the university in 1848 to commemorate Adams' controversial role in the discovery of the planet Neptune. Originally open only to Cambridge graduates, the current stipulation is that the mathematician must reside in the UK and must be under forty years of age. Each year applications are invited from mathematicians who have worked in a specific area of mathematics.  the Adams Prize is worth approximately £14,000. The prize is awarded in three parts. The first third is paid directly to the candidate; another third is paid to the candidate's institution to fund research expenses; and the final third is paid on publication of a survey paper in the winner's field in a major mathematics journal.

The prize has been awarded to many well known mathematicians, including 
James Clerk Maxwell and Sir William Hodge. The first time it was awarded to a female mathematician was in 2002 when it was awarded to Susan Howson, then a lecturer at the University of Nottingham for her work on number theory and elliptic curves.

Subject area
 2014–15: "Algebraic Geometry"
 2015–16: "Applied Analysis".
 2016–17: "Statistical Analysis of Big Data".
 2017–18: “The Mathematics of Astronomy and Cosmology” 
 2018–19: “The Mathematics of Networks”

List of prize winners
The complete list of prize winners can be found on the Adams Prize webpage on the University of Cambridge's website. The following partial list is compiled from internet sources:

See also

 List of mathematics awards

References

Mathematical awards and prizes of the University of Cambridge
Awards established in 1848
British science and technology awards
Early career awards